John Laffin (21 September 1922 – 23 September 2000) was an Australian 20th century military historian.

Early life
John Alfred Charles Laffin was born on 21 September 1922 at Mosman, Sydney, Australia. Both of his parents had served with the British Imperial military forces in World War I, his father as a commissioned infantry officer, and his mother as a nurse.

In the late 1930s Laffin was employed as a trainee journalist on the staff of Smith's Weekly, one of Australia's most patriotic newspaper-style magazines, and the Wagga Wagga Advertiser. In 1941 he enlisted as a Private into the 2nd Australian Imperial Force, subsequently being commissioned as an officer and going on to see active service in the New Guinea campaign in World War II.

Journalism, education and writing career
After the war, Laffin worked for a number of newspapers and magazines and began his own feature service and editing unit. In the mid-1950s he relocated with his family to the United Kingdom, where he resided for 40 years, earning a living initially as a school master, teaching History, English and Geography in secondary schools, one of which was Mayfield College in East Sussex (where he taught in the 1960s whilst living in Herstmonceux). In the late 1950s he attempted to establish himself as a fiction writer, publishing several novellas under the pseudonyms 'Carl Dekker' and 'Mark Napier', but without commercial success.

In the early 1960s, while still working as a teacher, he began writing military histories, which after a few years sold well enough to allow him to abandon teaching and earn a living as a professional military historian and writer, as well as intermittent pieces of journalism in the field. Laffin was a prodigious author, producing works - many of which possessed a personally opinionated viewpoint of their subject matter - regularly for publication on a range of modern military history subjects, ranging from conflicts in the Middle East, the Falklands War, and several works on World War II, but the central subject that he returned to repeatedly throughout his career over the next 40 years was the British experience of World War I. He travelled extensively in Europe, especially along the old battlefields of World War I's Western Front.

In the field of World War I history he was trenchantly of "The Donkeys" school of thought on the subject of British Generalship, castigating the British Army High Command's conduct of military operations in the war as being wantonly profligate with the lives of its soldiers. His views, generally expressed in a choleric fashion, in this regard were detailed in his work British Butchers & Bunglers of World War One (1998), and he appeared in a British Broadcasting Corporation 'Timewatch' series television documentary on Field Marshal Earl Haig, entitled Haig: The Unknown Soldier (1996), proffering the same historical commentary.

Laffin was the instigator behind the creation of the Australian Corps Memorial Park, at Le Hamel, France, dedicated to the Australian troops who served on the Western Front in World War I. He also founded the Families & Friends of the 1st Australian Imperial Force, a society dedicated to maintaining the historical and cultural memory of the men of Australia's primary expeditionary force that fought in World War I.

Death
Laffin returned to reside in Australia from the United Kingdom in failing health in 1995. He died in Canberra on 23 September 2000 at the age of 78.

Personal life
While medically convalescing in Sydney in 1943 during World War II he met his future wife, Hazelle (died 1997), who was serving as a Red Cross nurse. The marriage produced two daughters and a son. Bronwyn, Craig and Pirenne.

Select bibliography
 Return to Glory. Sydney: Angus and Robertson, 1956. 
 Middle East Journey. Sydney: Angus and Robertson, 1958.  
 The Devil's Emissary. London & Sydney: Horwitz Publications, 1958.  
 The Dancer of San Jose.  London: Horwitz Publications, 1958.  
 Jungle Manhunt. London: Horwitz Publications, 1958. 
 The Face of War – the evolution of weapons and their use in ten famous battles With Ab elard-Schuman. London, 1963.
 Swifter Than Eagles: The Biography of Marshal of the Royal Air Force Sir John Maitland Salmond. Edinburgh: W. Blackwood, 1964. 
 Codes and Ciphers: Secret Writing through the Ages. London; New York: Abelard-Schuman, 1964.  
 Anzacs at War: The Story of Australian and New Zealand Battles. London: Abelard-Schuman, 1965. 
 Jack Tar:  the story of the British sailor. Cassell, 1969. 
 Surgeons in the Field. J.M. Dent and Sons. London, 1970. 
 Letters from the Front, 1914–1918. London: Dent, 1973.   
 Fedayeen. The Arab-Israeli Dilemma. New York: Free Press, 1973. 
 The Arab Mind: A Need for Understanding. Cassell, London, 1975. 
 The Dagger of Islam. Sphere Books Limited, 1979. 
 Damn the Dardanelles!: The Story of Gallipoli. London: Osprey, 1980.  
 The Israeli Army in the Middle East wars, 1948–73. London: Osprey, 1982.  
 Fight for the Falklands! Sphere Books Limited, London, 1982. 
 The Man the Nazis Couldn't Catch. Gloucester : A. Sutton, 1984.   
 On the Western Front: Soldiers Stories from France and Flanders, 1914–1918. Gloucester: A. Sutton, 1985.  
 Holy War: Islam Fights, John Laffin, Grafton Books, London, 1988. 
 The War of Desperation: Lebanon 1982–85.  London: Osprey, 1985. 
 A Western Front Companion, 1914–1918: A-Z Source to the Battles, Weapons, People, Places, Air Combat. Far Thrupp: Alan Sutton, 1994. 
 We Will Remember Them, Kangaroo Press, Sydney, 1995. 
 Hitler Warned Us. Brasseys, London, 1995. 
 Jackboot : a history of the German soldier 1713–1945. First published 1965 in hardback by Cassell & Company Ltd.  Republished by David & Charles Publishers in 1989.  Republished by Barnes & Noble Books in 2000.  
 British Butchers and Bunglers of World War One. Godalming: Bramley, 1998.  Republished by Sutton Publishing, 2003. 
 Tommy Atkins: The Story of the English Soldier. Trafalgar Square, 2011

References

External links
 Biodata

1922 births
20th-century Australian non-fiction writers
Australian military historians
People from Sydney
2000 deaths
People from Herstmonceux
Australian Army personnel of World War II
Australian Army officers
Australian expatriates in Papua New Guinea
Australian expatriates in the United Kingdom